Stephen Craig Tobias was an American businessman. He was chief operating officer of Norfolk Southern Railway, and a director of Canadian Pacific Railway.

Life 
Tobias, a US Army veteran, joined Norfolk Southern in 1969 as a junior engineer, and served as Chief Operating Officer from 1998 to 2009, when he retired.

In 2012, he joined the Board of Directors of Canadian Pacific, and served briefly as CEO. He stepped down from the board in 2015 for personal reasons.

Tobias died August 7, 2017.

References 

2017 deaths
21st-century American railroad executives
Canadian Pacific Railway people
Year of birth missing